The Joint Services School of Intelligence - officially known as the School of Service Intelligence (SSI) - was formed in around 1969 by adding Royal Navy and Royal Air Force elements to the former School of Military Intelligence. It was based at Templer Barracks in Ashford, Kent, United Kingdom alongside the Headquarters and Depot of the British Army's Intelligence Corps and the Joint Service Interrogation Wing.

The SSI provided training to all elements of the British Armed Forces, civilian authorities and international partners, although Intelligence Corps recruit and trade training was carried out by the Depot. The SSI was later renamed the Defence Intelligence and Security School (DISS). In 1997, following the closure of Templer Barracks as a result of work on the Channel Tunnel Rail Link, the DISS and other elements were relocated to the Defence Intelligence and Security Centre, at Chicksands near Shefford, Bedfordshire. 

The Barracks have now been demolished with the exception of Repton Manor, a Grade II listed building.

Training

The SSI provided all trade training for regular and  Reserve soldiers and junior officers of the Intelligence Corps, preparing personnel for roles in the land warfare environment.  Other courses available for Royal Navy, Royal Air Force, civilian and international students encompassed  Signals Intelligence,  Human Intelligence,  Conduct after Capture, Analysis, Counter-intelligence and Security amongst others.

References 

Military training establishments of the United Kingdom
History of Ashford, Kent
Intelligence Corps (United Kingdom)